Rowena Turinawe (born circa 1987), is a Ugandan information technology professional and corporate executive, who works as the head of ICT Advisory, Strategy and Research at Centenary Technology Services Limited (Cente Tech), the information and communications technology division of Centenary Group. Before that, she served as business transformation manager at National Information Technology Authority Uganda (NITA-Uganda), a government parastatal organization.

Background and education
Turinawe is Ugandan by birth. After attending local primary and secondary schools, she was admitted to Makerere University, Uganda's largest and oldest public university. She graduated from there with a Bachelor of Information Technology degree.
Later, she was awarded a Master of Information Systems and Change Management, by the University of Manchester, in the United Kingdom. In addition, she has attended and graduated from multiple professional courses, including (a) Senior Leadership Development Training at Strathmore Business School (b) Change Management Practitioner (PROSCI) (c) Cisco Certified Network Associate (CCNA) (d) COBIT 5 (e) Information Technology Infrastructure Library (ITIL®) and (f) Project Management Professional (PMP®).

Career
Turinawe's career began in 2008, as an IT System Administrator Trainee at the Uganda Ministry of Finance Planning and Economic Development. After stints in two private companies, she was hired by MTN Uganda where she served as front office service manager for MTN IT shared services. In this capacity she led the technical support team in Uganda, Rwanda, Swaziland, Zambia, and South Sudan. In these five countries, with 48,000 employees, the team that she led responded to service request fulfillments and resolved incident reports in a timely manner.

In 2016, she joined NITA Uganda, first working as a portfolio manager for the first three years and as business transformation manager for the next three years. She regarded as an expert in (a) strategic planning and implementation (b) enterprise architecture development (c) ICT strategy and research (d) IT service management (e) stakeholder management (f) technical support management and (g) service delivery.

Other considerations
In November 2021, Rowena Turinawe and her workmate Vivian Ddambya, both employed by NITA Uganda at the time, were recognized as being among the 35 Most Influential Women In Technology In Africa, by the publication CIO Africa, an authoritative industry magazine.

Also in November 2021, Turinawe was named by Joyce Ssebugwawo, the Ugandan State Minister of Information and Communications Technology, to be a member of the newly created Business Processing Outsourcing (BPO) and Innovation Council. The body is tasked to work with government to create jobs for youth in ICT and reduce unemployment.

See also
 Barbara Kasekende
 Hope Ekudu
 Catherine Muraga

References

External links
 Centenary Bank Website
 Centenary Group Establishes Cente Tech and Secures Land to Build Tier 3 Data Centre As of 17 February 2022.

1980s births
Living people
Ugandan business executives
Ugandan women business executives
Centenary Bank people
People from Western Region, Uganda
Makerere University alumni
Alumni of the University of Manchester
Centenary Group
21st-century Ugandan businesswomen
21st-century Ugandan businesspeople